Lego Stunt Rally is a Lego-themed racing video game for Microsoft Windows and Game Boy Color. Developed by Intelligent Games for PC and Graphic State for Game Boy Color and published by Lego Media, the game features a track editor that allows players to build single-player and multiplayer tracks. A PlayStation version of the game in development at Asylum Entertainment, but eventually canceled shortly before release.

Gameplay
Lego Stunt Rally features driving with a slot car-esque control; the player controls the acceleration and braking, but steering is controlled automatically (although the player can change lanes and influence how their vehicle takes corners). There are also powerups which the player can pick up and use at any time, much like kart racers.

The main feature of the game is the track editor, which allows the player to build their own tracks. When the game is first played, the editor will only have a selection of basic track pieces to work with, along with only two of the four environments. To gain more pieces and environment options, the player has to race in the game's career mode, including twenty-one races. When the player wins career events, they unlock new features for the editor, including powerups, environments, and track pieces.

References

2000 video games
Cancelled PlayStation (console) games
Game Boy Color games
Graphic State games
Stunt Rally
Multiplayer and single-player video games
Racing video games
Video games developed in the United Kingdom
Windows games